Halobacillus karajensis is a species of bacteria. It is halophilic, Gram-positive, spore-forming, strictly aerobic and rod-shaped. Its type strain is MA-2T (=DSM 14948T =LMG 21515T). Halobacillus karajensis is commonly found in marine environment. S.I. Paul et al. (2021) isolated and characterized Halobacillus karajensis from marine sponges of the Saint Martin's Island of the Bay of Bengal, Bangladesh.

References

Further reading

Staley, James T., et al. "Bergey's manual of systematic bacteriology, vol. 3."Williams and Wilkins, Baltimore, MD (1989): 2250–2251.

External links

LPSN
Type strain of Halobacillus karajensis at BacDive -  the Bacterial Diversity Metadatabase

Bacillaceae
Bacteria described in 2003